Yi or YI may refer to:

Philosophic Principle 

 Yì (义; 義, righteousness, justice) among the Three Fundamental Bonds and Five Constant Virtues

Ethnic groups
 Dongyi, the Eastern Yi, or Tung-yi (Chinese: , Yí), ancient peoples who lived east of the Zhongguo in ancient China
 Yi people (Chinese: , Yí; Vietnamese: Lô Lô), an ethnic group in modern China, Vietnam, and Thailand

Language 
 Yi (Cyrillic), the letter of the Ukrainian alphabet written "Ї" and "ї"
 Yi language or the Nuosu language spoken by the Yi people of China
 Yi script, an umbrella term for two scripts used to write the Yi languages
 Yiddish (ISO 639-1 language code: yi), the historical language of the Ashkenazi Jews

Mythology and religion
 Yi the Archer or Houyi, a heroic archer and hunter in Chinese mythology
 Yi (husbandman), also known as Boyi or Bo Yi, a heroic user of fire and government minister in Chinese mythology
 Yi (Confucianism), the Confucian virtue roughly equivalent to "righteousness" or "justice"

People

Surname 
 Yi (Chinese surname), romanization of several Chinese surnames, for example:
 Yi Jianlian (born 1984), Chinese basketball player
 Yi Yuanji (1000–1064), 10th-century Chinese painter
 Yi Siling (born 1989), Chinese shooter, the first athlete to win a gold medal at the London 2012 Olympic Games
 Yi (Korean surname), including
 House of Yi, household of Joseon and the Korean Empire
 Yi Sun-sin (1545–1598), Korean admiral

Given name 
 Lu Yi (disambiguation), several persons
 Wu Yi (politician) (born 1938), Vice Premier of China

Places 
 Yi County (disambiguation), two counties in China
 Yí River, a river in Uruguay
 Yi River (Henan), a river in China
 Serbia and Montenegro (FIPS country code: YI), a country in Southeast Europe

Other uses 
 Yi (dinosaur)
 Yi (drinkware), former name for the zun, a traditional bronze drinkware of ancient China
 Yi (prefix symbol), the prefix symbol of the binary unit prefix yobi, representing 280, the equivalent of the decimal prefix yotta- (Y)
 Yi, an East Asian counting unit meaning 100,000,000
 Yi (vessel), a different kind of bronze vessel used in traditional rituals in ancient China
 YI Technology, a Chinese company that manufactures cameras and computer vision technologies
 I Ching, or Yijing, ancient Chinese text
 "Yi" and "iMi", songs by American indie folk bank Bon Iver

See also
 Yii
 Yi Prefecture (disambiguation)

Language and nationality disambiguation pages